Behind the Light is the second studio album by American recording artist Phillip Phillips. It was released on May 16, 2014, by Interscope Records.

Background
The album was produced by Gregg Wattenberg, Dereck Fuhrmann and Phillip Phillips, and was recorded in New York City. Upon the development of the album, Phillips discussed the concept of the album at the Billboard Music Awards red carpet:
"It' so much more mature," I got to spend some more time on it. It's a little more on the rock side, which is me and how I represent it when I play live." "I wanted to keep it the same because they know how I like to write," the 23-year-old says. "We worked so well together. It's very organic and it's not getting all these writers to come in (and say), 'We need a big pop song.' That's not how it is. It's an album as a whole, not just singles." - Phillip Phillips

Release and promotion
Both Standard and Deluxe Editions became available on May 19, 2014. Universal Music South Africa released a South African Special Tour Edition to celebrate Phillips touring South Africa with The Script in February 2015.

Singles
"Raging Fire", the lead single was released on March 3, 2014. The song speaks about "the power of love" and as described by Phillips "it's just a song wanting to feel those butterflies, you know you love and you know the first time you kissed that person" he says in an interview with Access Hollywood. The song was later solicited to Adult Album Alternative radio on March 17, 2014. The song received critical acclaim by music critics who praised Phillips vocals. He performed the song live on various TV shows, including The Ellen DeGeneres Show, American Idol and on Conan. Phillips also performed on Good Morning America on May 20 and on Today on June 27 and he returned to the PBS Independence Day celebration TV special, A Capitol Fourth. The music video for "Raging Fire" premiered on Vevo on April 10. Before its release, Phillips stated that he and his writers just wrote the song a week prior to the release. The song was featured in the National Hockey League's Playoffs. Phillips received his first BMI pop music song writing award for "Raging Fire".

On April 22, "Fly" was released as a promotional single.

The second single from the album is "Unpack Your Heart". The song was featured in a TV commercial for Ram 1500 trucks, which premiered at the American Music Awards of 2014.

Critical reception

Behind the Light received mixed to positive reviews from music critics. At AllMusic, Stephen Thomas Erlewine rated the album three stars out of five, saying that "Perhaps Phillips has yet to find his distinctive voice, but there's no question he can color within the lines exceedingly well." Brian Mansfield of USA Today rated the album two-and-a-half stars out of four, writing that "Phillips may not have a Home-style hit here, but does have the consistency and confidence that come with steady performing." At The Oakland Press, Gary Graff rated the album two-and-a-half stars out of four, stating that Phillips' deserved some "Props, then, for incremental growth, and respect for a more genuinely organic grounding than most of his 'Idol' brethren." Glenn Gamboa of Newsday graded the album a B, saying that "Phillip Phillips takes a giant leap forward on his sophomore album". At Billboard, Shirley Halprin gave the album a positive review, writing how "'Behind the Light,' feels more like a collection of big singles as opposed to a coherent album, with ebbs and flows" on which Phillips "mostly adheres to a strict formula: acoustic-based melodies accented by strings, building up to a huge hook and back again." Chuck Campbell of Knoxville News Sentinel rated the album three-and-a-half stars out of five, stating that "His lyrics may be tortured at times, but sometimes he nails it".

Commercial performance
The album debuted on the Billboard 200 at No. 7 with sales of 41,000 units in the U.S. The album has sold 123,000 copies in the U.S. as of December 2014.

Track listing
The track listing was announced April 22, 2014.

Personnel
Credits adapted from AllMusic.

Phillip Phillips  – Guitar, producer, vocals 
John Alicastro  – Background vocals
Randy Andros  – Trombone
Dallin Applebaum   – Background vocals
Keith Armstrong  – Mixing assistant
Carrie Q. Brown  – Background vocals
Rob Carmichael  – Art direction, design
Todd Clark  – Background vocals
Errol Cooney  – Guitar
Jack Daley  – Bass
Michael Davis  – Trombone
Ian Discoll  – Background vocals, engineer
Dave Egger  – Cello, soloist, string arrangement
Mark Endert  – Mixing
Derek Fuhrmann  – Background vocals, drum programming, guitar, keyboards, piano producer 
Jon Green  – Piano engineer, vocal engineer
David Ryan Harris  – Drum programming
James Hynes  – Trumpet
Katie Jacoby  – Violin
Ted Jensen  – Mastering
Doug Johnson  – Mixing assistant
Jeff Juliano  – Mixing
Anthony Kadleck   – Trumpet
Marris Kainuma  – Tuba
Nik Kainuma  – Mixing assistant
Ryan Keberle  – Trombone
Adam Krauthamer  – French horn
Katie Kresek  – String arrangement, violin
Michael Lauri  – Background vocals

Chad Lefkowitz-Brown  – Tenor saxophone
Ryan Lipman  – Mixing assistant
Chris Lord-Alge  –Mixing
David Mann  – Saxophone
Gabriel McMahon  – Background vocals, percussion
Elisabeth Mercante   – background vocals
Maxium Moston  – Violin
Trevor Neumon  – Trumpet
Gunnar Olsen  – Drums
Chuck Palmer  – Percussion, string arrangements 
Victoria Paterson  – Violin
Shawn Pelton  – Drums, percussion
Ross Petersen  – Engineer
Robert Randolph  – Pedal steel guitar
Alycia Scott  – Background vocals
Lee Scurry  – Producer
Lenny Skolnik  – Pro-tools vocals
Robert "JJ" Smith Jr.  – Bass
Andy Snitzar  – Horn arrangement, saxophone 
Bobby Sparks III  – Keyboards
Rod Steger  – Keyboard engineer
Meredith Strang   – Background vocals
Jason "JT" Thomas  – Drums
Jonathan Verti  – Background vocals
Nick Walker  – Photography
Gregg Wattenberg  – Background vocals, guitar, producer
Dana Wise  – Background vocals
Paul Woodiel  – Violin
Robin Zek  – Violin
Joe Zook  – Mixing

Charts

Peak positions

Release history

References

2014 albums
Phillip Phillips albums
19 Recordings albums
Interscope Records albums
Interscope Geffen A&M Records albums
Albums produced by Gregg Wattenberg